Kielce Governorate was an administrative unit (governorate) of Congress Poland.

History
It was created in 1841 from the Kraków Governorate, both with capital in Kelets (Кѣльцы). It was merged into Radom Governorate during the 1844 reorganisation that reduced the number of governorates to just five. In 1866/67 it was recreated in the further reforms that brought the administrative structure of Poland closer to that of the Russian Empire.

It consisted of 7 powiats: Jędrzejów, Kielce, Miechów, Olkusz, Pińczów, Stopnica and Włoszczowa.

Language

By the Imperial census of 1897. In bold are languages spoken by more people than the state language.

References and notes

See also
Geographical Dictionary of the Kingdom of Poland

 
Governorates of Congress Poland
States and territories established in 1841
History of Lesser Poland Voivodeship
History of Świętokrzyskie Voivodeship
Establishments in Congress Poland